Plancoët (Gallo: Plancoét) is a commune in the Côtes-d'Armor department in Brittany in northwestern France.

The Arguenon river flows through the commune.

Population

Inhabitants of Plancoët are called plancoëtins in French.

See also
Communes of the Côtes-d'Armor department

References

External links

Official website 

Communes of Côtes-d'Armor